Bluff, also known as Agookauchuk (Iġukuchiq in Iñupiaq), was a 20th-century mining town in Nome Census Area, Alaska. 
It was built at the mouth of Daniels Creek on the north shore of Norton Sound on the Seward Peninsula in the summer of 1900, as a result of the Nome Gold Rush. The settlement was served by a post office for eighteen years, from 1901 to 1919.

Demographics

Bluff appeared once on the 1940 U.S. Census as an unincorporated village. It has not appeared since. A few buildings are still extant at the townsite.

References

Mining communities in Alaska
Unincorporated communities in Nome Census Area, Alaska